The following is a list of emperors of the Yuan dynasty (1271–1368). It also contains early rulers (khagans-emperors and regents) of the Mongol Empire posthumously honored by Kublai Khan as Yuan emperors.

List of emperors

Timeline 

Legend:
  denotes monarchs of the Mongol Empire
  denotes Yuan monarchs
  denotes Northern Yuan monarchs

References

External links

See also 
 Yuan dynasty family tree
 List of Northern Yuan khans
 List of Yuan empress consorts
 List of Chinese monarchs
 List of Mongol rulers

 
Lists of Chinese monarchs
Yuan
Lists of Chinese people
Lists of leaders of China